Mark Walsh may refer to:

 Mark Walsh (businessman) (born 1954), American entrepreneur, venture capitalist, and political activist
 Mark Walsh (cricketer) (born 1972), Australian cricketer
 Mark Walsh (darts player) (born 1965), English darts player
 Mark Walsh (jockey) (born 1986), Irish jockey
 Mark E. Walsh, US deputy Chief of Protocol